Goondiwindi Airport  is an airport located  north of Goondiwindi, Queensland, Australia.

During the 2011 Queensland floods disaster, a temporary field hospital was established at the airport as the town hospital had been inundated.

See also
 List of airports in Queensland

References 

Airports in Queensland